The 1927 Úrvalsdeild is an season of top-flight Icelandic football.

Overview
The number of teams dropped back to four as ÍBV did not enter. KR won the championship.

League standings

Results

References

Úrvalsdeild karla (football) seasons
Iceland
Iceland
Urvalsdeild